Grinda is a French surname. Notable people with the surname include:

Édouard Grinda (1866–1959), French politician
Fabrice Grinda, French businessman
Jean-Louis Grinda (born 1960), Monegasque opera manager and politician
Jean-Noel Grinda (born 1936), French tennis player
Grinda Brothers, pipe organ builders

French-language surnames